Gallaudet University Press (GUPress) is a publisher that focuses on issues relating to deafness and sign language. It is a part of Gallaudet University in Washington D.C., and was founded in 1980 by the university's Board of Trustees. The press is a member of the Association of University Presses. The press publishes two quarterly journals: American Annals of the Deaf and Sign Language Studies.

Mission statement 
Gallaudet University Press is a vital, self-supporting member of the Gallaudet educational and scholarly community. The mission of the Press is to disseminate knowledge about deaf and hard of hearing people, their languages, their communities, their history, and their education through print and electronic media.

Series

The Gallaudet Classics in Deaf Studies Series 
The series' editor is Kristen C. Harmon. The first volume of this series, published in 1998, was a reprinting of Albert Ballin's book The Deaf Mute Howls; which was originally printed in 1930. The 11th volume of the series is due to be published in June 2018.

The Sociolinguistics in Deaf Communities Series 
The series' editors are Ceil Lucas and Jordan Fenlon. The first volume of this series was published in 1995. The 23rd volume of this series was published in January 2018.

The Studies in Interpretation Series 
The series' editors are Melanie Metzger and Earl Fleetwood. The 16th volume of this series is due to be published in May 2018.

See also

 List of English-language book publishing companies
 List of university presses

References

External links
Official site

Academic publishing
Academic publishing companies
Book publishing companies based in Washington (state)
Deaf culture in the United States
Gallaudet University
Publishing companies established in 1980
Scholarly communication
University presses of the United States